A list of films produced by the Marathi language film industry based in Maharashtra in the year 2008.

January–March

April–June

July–September

October–December

References

Lists of 2008 films by country or language
2008
2008 in Indian cinema